Michael Ernest Bowering  (25 June 1935 – 25 April 2015) was Archdeacon of Lindisfarne from 1987 until 2000.

Bowering was educated at Barnstaple Grammar School; Kelham Theological College; and York St John University College. After curacies in Middlesbrough and  New Earswick he held incumbencies at Brayton and Saltburn by the Sea. He was a Canon Residentiary at York Minster from 1981 to 1987.

Notes

1935 births
2015 deaths
People educated at Barnstaple Grammar School
Archdeacons of Lindisfarne
Alumni of York St John University
Alumni of Kelham Theological College